The Lakeside EfW is located in Colnbrook, Slough, and is the largest facility of its kind in England. It incinerates residual waste, and since 2010 it has also been authorised to incinerate low-level radioactive waste.

Ownership
The Lakeside EfW is run by Lakeside Energy from Waste Ltd, which is a joint venture between Grundon Waste Management and Viridor. The energy-from-waste facility was established at a cost of £160 million and was officially opened by the Duke of Edinburgh on 27 October 2010.

Capacity
It is capable of processing 410,000 tonnes of residual waste annually and generating 37MW of electricity, enough to power the borough of Slough.

Possible relocation
In 2014, expansion plans for London's Heathrow Airport suggested that the super incinerator would need to be relocated to make way for a new runway.

References

External links 

 

Waste power stations in England